Columbia Township, also known as Columbia Station or just Columbia, is the easternmost of the eighteen townships of Lorain County, Ohio, United States. Columbia Township is the official government name, while Columbia Station is the post office name, and tends to be the town name used by residents. The post office name was chosen to differentiate the township from other Columbia Townships statewide, located in Hamilton and Meigs counties.

As of the 2010 census, the township had a population of 7,040.

Geography 
The west branch of the Rocky River and Plum Creek flow through the township from south to north.

Columbia Township is part of Greater Cleveland.

Located in eastern Lorain County, it borders the following townships and cities:
Olmsted Township, Cuyahoga County - north
Olmsted Falls - north
Berea, Cuyahoga County - northeast corner
Strongsville, Cuyahoga County - east
Brunswick Hills Township, Medina County - southeast corner
Liverpool Township, Medina County - south
Grafton Township - southwest corner
Eaton Township - west
North Ridgeville - northwest corner

No municipalities are located in Columbia Township.

Government
The township is governed by a three-member board of trustees, who are elected in November of odd-numbered years to a four-year term beginning on the following January 1. Two are elected in the year after the presidential election and one is elected in the year before it. There is also an elected township fiscal officer, who serves a four-year term beginning on April 1 of the year after the election, which is held in November of the year before the presidential election. Vacancies in the fiscal officership or on the board of trustees are filled by the remaining trustees.

Columbia Station has a public library, a branch of the Lorain Public Library.

History 

Columbia Township is part of the Connecticut Western Reserve, lands ceded in 1786 by Connecticut after the American Revolution. In 1805, two years after Ohio became a state, the federal government finalized treaties with local American Indians. The reserve was surveyed and parcelled into rough  blocks (smaller than the typical  townships in the midwestern United States). The Bronson and Hoadley families of Waterbury, Connecticut, pooled together $20,087 to purchase a township. On April 4, 1807, they drew Township 5 N, Range 15 W from a random selection of townships in the reserve, purchasing the land site-unseen.

Columbia Township has been continuously inhabited since 1807, the longest settlement in the Western Reserve west of the Cuyahoga River. It has other firsts in the area: the first classroom (Bronson cabin, summer of 1808), first teacher (Sally Bronson, 1808), first white child born (Sally Hoadley), first gristmill (summer of 1809), first cemetery (1811), first doctor (Zephaniah Potter, 1809), and first organized church society (Episcopal, 1809).

The Bronson House Museum (built c. 1850, 13646 W River Road) is the last home of Sally Bronson. Other Columbia Township buildings in the National Register of Historic Places include the Columbia Town Hall (added 1976, #76001468, 25496 Royalton Road) and the Columbia Baptist Church (added 1976, #76001466, 25514 Royalton Road).

The Copopa School was built in 1921. The name originates as follows:

Farming has historically been the most significant employer in Columbia Township and the surrounding townships, but in the second half of the 19th century, sandstone from the local quarries was mined and widely distributed. Two of the township's quarries were Jaquay Quarry and an area which later became known as Wildwood Lake. Both Jaquay and Wildwood were used as swimming parks in the late 20th century, with Wildwood operating until 2001.

On April 11, 1965, an F4 tornado swept through Columbia Township before dissipating to the east in neighboring Strongsville.

At the 2007 Homecoming, Columbia Township celebrated its bicentenary. For the previous fifty years, the township had not experienced the urban sprawl that developed in neighboring areas, but the number of farms in the township has fallen significantly.

Parks 

The park has  of trails running through ponds, marshes, wet meadows and swamps. The park is popular with bird watchers, as more than 50 species of birds, including the great blue heron, can be seen there. An additional  are planned to be added to the park.

Columbia Township Park is also located in Columbia Station. The park also hosts various festivals year-round.

In 2007, the Columbia VFW completed work on a new veterans' memorial located at Columbia Township Park. The memorial was dedicated on Memorial Day 2007 in front of a crowd of over 1,000.

References

External links 

Columbia Chamber of Commerce
Columbia Historical Society
Columbia Local Schools

Townships in Lorain County, Ohio
Populated places established in 1807
Townships in Ohio